The Laverton Magpies Football Club is an Australian rules football club which compete in the WRFL  since 1988,
They are based in the Melbourne suburb of Laverton, Victoria

History
In 1924, the original Laverton Football Club was formed and participated for many years in the Werribee District and the Western Suburbs Football Leagues. In 1988 the club joined the Footscray District Football League where they currently participate in the 3rd Division. In 2000 the club changed their name to the Western Magpies Football Club. In 2001 the under 12 and under 14 sides both won premierships in B division causing all junior sides to play in A division the next season. In 2009 the club changed the name back to the Laverton Magpies Football Club.

==Premierships==
 Western Region Football League
 Division Three Seniors (1): 1989
 Division Three reserves (1): 1994
 Under 12 (2): 2000, 2001
 Under 14 (2): 2001, 2005
 Under 16 (1): 2004

Bibliography
 History of the WRFL/FDFL by Kevin Hillier – 
 History of football in Melbourne's north west by John Stoward –

References

External links
Official website

Australian rules football clubs in Melbourne
Australian rules football clubs established in 2000
2000 establishments in Australia
Western Region Football League clubs
Sport in the City of Hobsons Bay